Giannitsa Football Club was a Greek football club, based in Giannitsa, Pella, Greece. The club was established in 2018, after Doxa Mavrovouni F.C. renamed and relocated in Giannitsa in order to compete in the 2018-19 Gamma Ethniki. In July 2019, the club merged with the most important club of the town, Anagennisi Giannitsa.

References

Football clubs in Central Macedonia
Pella (regional unit)
Association football clubs established in 2018
2018 establishments in Greece
Association football clubs disestablished in 2019
2019 disestablishments in Greece
Gamma Ethniki clubs
Defunct football clubs in Greece